Events from the year 1712 in Denmark.

Incumbents
 Monarch – Frederick IV
 Grand Chancellor – Christian Christophersen Sehested

Events

 8 April  The Danish frigate Heyeren sinks in Præstø Ghord after being shot upon by the Swedish frigate Hvita Örn.
 11 April – Battle of Fladstrand, battle of the Great Northern War.
 11 May  The Danish ship of the line Fuen'' and four Danish frigates refuses an attack from six Swedish frigates north of Hirsholmene.
 1 July – The children of the theologian and landowner Hector Gottfried Masius are ennobled by letters patent with the name von der Maase.
 31 July – Action of 31 July, battle of the Great Northern War.
 17 August – Action of 17 August, battle of the Great Northern War.
 20 December  The Battle of Gadebusch.

Births

Undated
 Johan Peter Suhr, businessman (died 1785)

Deaths

References

 
1710s in Denmark
Denmark
Years of the 18th century in Denmark